The Desulfuromonadaceae are a family within the Thermodesulfobacteriota.

References

 
Bacteria families